Karuppur is a panchayat town in Salem District in the Indian state of Tamil Nadu. It is located on the National Highway 7 between Salem and Bangalore. The Periyar University, with which many Salem colleges are affiliated, is located here. Government College of Engineering, referred as GCE-Salem is also located here. It is a railway station on the Chennai-Shoranur railway line.

Demographics
 India census, Karuppur had a population of 13,003. Males constitute 52% of the population and females 48%. Karuppur has an average literacy rate of 60%, higher than the national average of 59.5%: male literacy is 80%, and female literacy is 50%. In Karuppur, 12% of the population is under 6 years of age.

Transport

Road
Karuppur is located on the National Highway 44 (connecting Srinagar and Kanyakumari). Frequent busses are available to Karuppur from the Town Bus Terminus and the Central Bus Terminus. Busses to Vellalapatti, Thekkampatti, Senkaradu, Omalur and Salem airport go via Karuppur.

Rail
Karuppur has a railway station which has a double electrified line located in the Jolarpettai-Shoranur line. It has 2 platforms and six halting trains. It is one of the major stations in Salem city used for handling goods and freight trains. Other stations nearby are Magnesite Junction, Salem Junction and Omalur Junction

Air
The nearest airport is Salem Airport which is located at a distance of 13km.

Education
The Government higher secondary school and Government College of Engineering, Salem is located at Karuppur. Periyar University to which most of the colleges are affiliated is also located here.

References

Cities and towns in Salem district